The Claridge Hotel is a five-star hotel in the city of Buenos Aires, Argentina.

Established in 1946, it was designed by architect Arturo Dubourg. Nowadays it is operated by Eurostars Hotels.

References

External links

Hotels in Buenos Aires
1946 establishments in Argentina
Hotels established in 1946
Hotel buildings completed in 1946
San Nicolás, Buenos Aires